Midden-Delfland is a municipality (gemeente) in the Westland region in the province of South Holland in the Netherlands.

It was formed on January 1, 2004, through the merger of the former municipalities:

Population Centres 
The municipality comprises the population centres:

Topography 

Dutch topographic map of the municipality of Midden-Delfland, June 2015

Geography 
The green area that comprises the municipality of Midden-Delfland was named Midden-Delfland before 2004, and it referred to the green area surrounded by cities (such as The Hague and Rotterdam) and the horticulture area of Westland. The supporters of a continuous green area were lucky that the municipality of Midden-Delfland became a reality: the cities of Delft, Vlaardingen and Schiedam wanted to build new houses here, and the Westland gardeners also wanted to expand. Now, Midden-Delfland is designated as a recreation area for people from the surrounding cities.

Notable people 
 Jan Vermeer van Utrecht (1630 in Schipluiden – ca. 1696) a Dutch Golden Age painter
 Marja van Bijsterveldt (born 1961) a Dutch politician, Mayor of Delft since 2016
 IJsbrand Chardon (born 1961) a Dutch equestrian and winner at the World Equestrian Games
 Ronald Vuijk (born 1965) a Dutch politician, alderman of Midden-Delfland 2011/2012
 Gerben Moerman  (born 1976 in Schipluiden) a Dutch sociologist and academic

Gallery

References

External links

Official website

 
Municipalities of South Holland
Municipalities of the Netherlands established in 2004